Linda Crew (born 1951) is an American author based in Oregon. Her writing ranges from children's books such as the "Nekomah Creek" series, to young adult Historical novels with crossover appeal for older readers such as Brides of Eden: A True Story Imagined, Firedhdhs on the Wind, and A Heart for Any Fate: Westward to Oregon 1845. Ordinary Miracles, published by William Morrow in 1993, is an adult novel. Her young adult novel Children of the River has won several awards. She graduated with a Bachelor of Arts in journalism from the University of Oregon, Phi Beta Kappa.  She lives in Corvallis with her husband.

Bibliography 
 Brides of Eden: A True Story Imagined
 A Heart for Any Fate: Westward to Oregon 1845 (Oregon Book Award 2005)
 Children of the River 
 Fire on the Wind
 Long Time Passing
 Someday I'll Laugh About This
 Nekomah Creek 
 Nekomah Creek Christmas
 Ordinary Miracles

See also
Children's literature
Young Adult literature

References

External links 
 Author's website
 Interview and brief biography

1951 births
Living people
American children's writers
American writers of young adult literature
Writers from Oregon